The 2022–23 Ferris State Bulldogs men's ice hockey season was the 48th season of play for the program and the 37th in the Central Collegiate Hockey Association (CCHA). The Bulldogs represented Ferris State University, played their home games at Ewigleben Arena and were coached by Bob Daniels in his 31st season.

Season
Ferris State had a bit of a mixed bag of a season. Noah Giesbrecht, who had joined the club in the middle of the previous year, established himself as the team's starting goaltender. Unfortunately, he got little help from the defense, which allowed more than 33 shots against per game. The offense was able to effectively replace its leading scorer, however, saw no improvement overall.

In the first half of the season the Bulldogs were rather inconsistent but did manage to put together a road sweep of Minnesota State. When they entered the winter break the team possessed a .500 record and were sitting in the top half of the CCHA. The second half of the year wasn't as kind. After a surprising win over Michigan State won just three more times over the next fifteen games and slid down to 6th in the standings.

When they began postseason play, the Bulldogs weren't expected to do much but the team managed to defy expectations. Giesbrecht weathered an 18-shot third period and enabled Ferris State to push Bowling Green into overtime. A goal from Nick Nardecchia put the team on the cusp of a conference semifinal appearance and Giesbrecht was again called upon to save the day. The sophomore held the Falcons scoreless until just over a minute remained in regulation but the team had just enough offense to send the game into extra time. This time Jason Brancheau scored with his team-leading 13th of the season and advanced the Bulldogs for the first time since 2016.

The team's run ended in the second round when top-seeded Minnesota State exacted their revenge with a 2–7 drubbing. Despite the loss, it was still the best season the program had seen in 7 years.

Departures

Recruiting

Roster
As of September 5, 2022.

Standings

Schedule and results

|-
!colspan=12 style=";" | Regular Season

|-
!colspan=12 style=";" | 

|-
!colspan=12 style=";" |

Scoring statistics

Goaltending statistics

Rankings

Note: USCHO did not release a poll in weeks 1, 13, or 26.

References

2022-23
Ferris State
Ferris State
Ferris State Bulldogs ice hockey, men's
Ferris State Bulldogs ice hockey, men's